Simeon Catharina (born 24 February 1998) is a Dutch judoka.

References

External links
 

1998 births
Living people
Dutch male judoka
Sportspeople from The Hague